Men's ice hockey tournaments have been staged at the Olympic Games since 1920. The men's tournament was introduced at the 1920 Summer Olympics, and permanently added to the Winter Olympic Games in 1924. Canada has participated in 21 of 23 tournaments, sending 38 goaltenders and 307 skaters.

For the first 40 years of the tournament, Canada did not have a national team, instead choosing to send a club team, typically the Allan Cup winner. In 1960, the Kitchener-Waterloo Dutchmen became the final club team to represent Canada at the Olympics. In 1962, Canada implemented a national team program, led by Father David Bauer. Between 1920 and 1952, seven Olympic ice hockey tournaments were held and Canada won six gold medals and a silver in 1936. The Soviet Union began competing in 1956 and frequently defeated the Canadian team. The Soviets won seven gold medals in nine tournaments; during that period Canada won a silver and two bronze medals. The Olympic Games were originally intended for amateur athletes, so the players of the National Hockey League (NHL) and other professional leagues were not allowed to compete. Many of Canada's top players were professional, so the Canadian Amateur Hockey Association (CAHA) pushed for the ability to use professional and amateur players. The International Olympic Committee (IOC) refused, and Canada withdrew from the 1972 and 1976 Olympics in protest. In 1986, the IOC voted to allow all athletes to compete in Olympic Games, starting in 1988. The NHL decided not to allow all players to participate in 1988, 1992 or 1994, because doing so would force the league to halt play during the Olympics. An agreement was reached in 1995 that allowed NHL players to compete in the Olympics, starting with the 1998 Games in Nagano, Japan. National teams are co-ordinated by Hockey Canada and players are chosen by the team's management staff. In 2018, NHL players were not allowed to participate.

Canada has won nine gold, four silver and two bronze medals in men's ice hockey, more than any other nation. Seventeen players have been inducted into the Hockey Hall of Fame, twelve into the IIHF Hall of Fame and eight into Canada's Sports Hall of Fame. The Canadian Olympic Hall of Fame has inducted three individuals and five gold medal winning teams: the 1920 Winnipeg Falcons, 1948 RCAF Flyers, 1952 Edmonton Mercurys and the 2002 and 2010 national teams. Two players—Martin Brodeur and Chris Pronger—have played on four teams. Nine others—Rob Blake, Adam Foote, Jarome Iginla, Eric Lindros, Roberto Luongo, Terry O'Malley, Rick Nash, Joe Sakic and Wally Schreiber—have played on three teams. According to the IOC database, 252 men have won medals; 15 players—Brodeur, Patrice Bergeron, Sidney Crosby, Drew Doughty, Ryan Getzlaf, Iginla, Duncan Keith, Roberto Luongo, Patrick Marleau, Nash, Scott Niedermayer, Corey Perry, Pronger, Jonathan Toews and Shea Weber—have won two gold medals. Eight others players—Lindros, Schreiber, Fabian Joseph, Brad Schlegel, Paul Kariya, Ken Laufman, Floyd Martin and Donald Rope—have won two medals. Chris Pronger holds the record for most games played, having dressed for 25 games in four Olympics between 1998 and 2010. Wally Schreiber is second in games played, with 24 games in 1988, 1992 and 1994. Harry Watson leads Canadian Olympians in goals, having scored 36 goals in 1924 (before assists were counted); Walter Halder scored 29 points (21 goals and 8 assists) in 1948; and Ken Laufman recorded 14 assists in 1956 and 1960.

Key

Goaltenders

Reserve goaltenders
These goaltenders were named to the Olympic roster, but did not receive any ice time during games. Martin Brodeur and Curtis Joseph did not play in any games at the 1998 Winter Olympics, but did start games at later tournaments.

Skaters

Reserve skaters
These players were named to the Olympic roster, but did not play in any games.

Note 1. Sources vary on whether these players received a medal, although the IOC lists them as having received one.
Note 2. That player's team won a medal, although the player is not listed as having received one in the IOC database.
Note 3. Player was named to the 2006 team's taxi squad and took part in team practices, but did not dress for games.

See also

 List of Men's World Ice Hockey Championship players for Canada (1977–present)
 List of IIHF World Under-20 Championship players for Canada
 List of Canadian national ice hockey team rosters

Notes

References

External links
 Hockey Canada - Official website
 2010 Olympic Team - Hockey Canada
 Olympic Review and Revue Olympique. LA84 Foundation

Canada
 
Olympic
Canada
Ice Hockey